Urophora hermonis is a species of tephritid or fruit flies in the genus Urophora of the family Tephritidae.

Distribution
Israel, Iran.

References

Urophora
Insects described in 1974
Diptera of Asia